Sir Joseph William Chitty (28 May 1828 – 15 February 1899) was an English cricketer, rower, judge and Liberal politician.

Early life

Chitty was born in London, the second son of Thomas Chitty (himself son and brother of well-known lawyers), a celebrated special pleader and writer of legal textbooks, under whose teaching many distinguished lawyers began their legal education. Joseph Chitty was educated at Eton College and Balliol College, Oxford, gaining a first-class in Literae Humaniores in 1851, and being afterwards elected to a fellowship at Exeter College.

Sporting distinctions
Chitty was an all round sportsman with distinctions during his school and college career in athletics. He was a cricket wicket-keeper and played in the Eton v Harrow match in four years, captaining Eton in 1847. He also kept wicket for Marylebone Cricket Club (MCC) in 1846 and 1847. He played for Oxford University in 1848 and 1849, partaking in the Varsity match each year. Oxford won in 1848, but lost in 1849. In cricket, he played 12 innings in 7 first-class matches with an average of 15.66 and a top score of 20. He took 6 catches and stumped three times.

Chitty rowed in the Oxford University crew in both the Boat Races that were run in 1849, the March race and the December race, each university winning once. He rowed in the Oxford University eight that won the Grand Challenge Cup at Henley Royal Regatta in 1850 when there was no Boat Race on the Tideway. He also rowed in the Oxford coxed four that won the Stewards' Challenge Cup at Henley and in the same year he won the Silver Goblets, the first year the coxless pair event was run under that name. His partner was James John Hornby and they beat Thomas Howard Fellows and C L Vaughan in the final. 

He repeated his success in the Grand Challenge Cup, and in the Silver Goblets in 1851 partnering James Aitken in the latter to beat John Erskine Clarke and C L Vaughan in the final. In 1852, he stroked the winning Oxford crew in the 1852 Boat Race. In 1853 he was in the Oxford four that won Stewards again and was playing cricket for I Zingari. For many years Chitty umpired the Boat Race.

In 1873 Chitty responded to Dr J Morgan, who was investigating the health effects of rowing.

"In answer to your questions, I may state that during my residence at Oxford I rowed in the University Eight against Cambridge three times at Putney, and once at Henley. I also rowed in the University Four, and in Pair-Oar Races at Oxford, Henley and the Thames Regatta. My own personal experience extends over a period of about five years, during a great part of which I was rowing in races. I am not aware that I have in any way suffered in health, either from the training or the rowing; on the contrary, my belief is that I derived from them great benefit physically."

Legal and political career

Chitty entered Lincoln's Inn in 1851, was called to the bar in 1856, and made a Queen's Counsel in 1874, electing to practise as such in the court of Sir George Jessel, Master of the Rolls.  

In 1880, he entered the House of Commons as member for the city of Oxford. His parliamentary career was short, for in 1881 the Judicature Act required that the Master of the Rolls should cease to sit regularly as a judge of first instance, and Chitty was selected to fill the vacancy thus created in the Chancery Division. 

Sir Joseph Chitty was for sixteen years a popular judge, in the best meaning of the phrase, being noted for his courtesy, geniality, patience and scrupulous fairness, as well as for his legal attainments, and being much respected and liked by those practising before him, in spite of a habit of interrupting counsel, possibly acquired through the example of Sir George Jessel.

In 1897, upon the retirement of Sir Edward Kay, L.J., he was promoted to the Court of Appeal. There he added to his reputation as a lawyer and a judge, proving that he possessed considerable knowledge of the common law as well as of equity.

Personal life 
In 1858, he married Clara Jessie, daughter of Chief Baron Pollock, leaving children who could claim descent from two of the best-known English legal families of the 19th century.

Grandchildren included Letitia Chitty (1897 – 1982) a structural analytical engineer who became the first female fellow of the Royal Aeronautical Society.

Cases
Sumpter v Hedges
Cann v Willson (1888) 39 Ch D 39

See also
List of Oxford University Boat Race crews

Notes

References

The Rowers of Vanity Fair – J W Chitty

External links 
 

1828 births
1899 deaths
Members of the Privy Council of the United Kingdom
Lords Justices of Appeal
Chancery Division judges
Fellows of Exeter College, Oxford
Alumni of Balliol College, Oxford
Liberal Party (UK) MPs for English constituencies
People educated at Eton College
English cricketers
Oxford University cricketers
English male rowers
UK MPs 1880–1885
Marylebone Cricket Club cricketers
Gentlemen of England cricketers
Oxford and Cambridge Universities cricketers
Knights Bachelor
Chitty family